Alfonsus (Fons) Trompenaars (born 1953, Amsterdam) is a Dutch
organizational theorist, management consultant, and author in the field of cross-cultural communication. known for the development of Trompenaars' model of national culture differences.

Biography 
In 1979, Trompenaars received his MA in Economics at the Vrije Universiteit and in 1983 his PhD from the Wharton School of the University of Pennsylvania for the thesis The Organization of Meaning and the Meaning of Organization.

In 1981 Trompenaars started his career at the Royal Dutch Shell Personnel Division, working on job classification and management development. In 1989 together with Charles Hampden-Turner he founded and directed the consultancy firm Centre for International Business Studies, working for such companies as BP, Philips, IBM, Heineken, AMD, Mars, Motorola, General Motors, Merrill Lynch, Johnson & Johnson, Pfizer, ABN AMRO, ING, PepsiCo, Honeywell. In 1998 the company was bought by KPMG and renamed Trompenaars Hampden-Turner.

Trompenaars was awarded the International Professional Practice Area Research Award by the American Society for Training and Development (ASTD) in 1991. Subsequently, in 1999 Business magazine ranked him as one of the top 5 management consultants next to Michael Porter, Tom Peters and Edward de Bono. In 2011, he was voted one of the top 20 HR Most Influential International Thinkers by HR Magazine. In 2015, he was once again ranked in the Thinkers50 of the most influential management thinkers alive and in 2017 inducted into the Thinkers50 Hall of Fame.

Trompenaars wrote Riding the Waves of Culture, Understanding Cultural Diversity in Business. This book (in its third edition) sold over 120,000 copies and was translated into 16 languages amongst them, French, German, Dutch, Korean, Danish, Turkish, Chinese, Hungarian and Portuguese. He is co-author amongst others of Nine Visions of Capitalism: Unlocking the Meanings of Wealth Creation and Rewarding Performance Globally.

Positions
- 	Co-Director at the Servant-Leadership Centre for Research and Education (SERVUS) at the Vrije Universiteit, Amsterdam.
-	Member of Advisory Board Webster University Leiden.
- 	Distinguished Advisor of Centre for TransCultural Studies at Temasek Polytechnic, Singapore.
- 	International Director at the International Society for Organisational Development.
- 	Faculty member at the Global Institute for Leadership Development (GILD).
- 	Judge of the Fons Trompenaars award for Cross Cultural Management  (AHRI).

Work

Trompenaars' model of national culture differences 

Trompenaars' model of national culture differences is a framework for cross-cultural communication applied to general business and management, developed by Trompenaars and Charles Hampden-Turner. This model of national culture differences has seven dimensions.
 Universalism vs. particularism (What is more important, rules or relationships?) 
 Individualism vs. collectivism (communitarianism) (Do we function in a group or as individuals?)
 Neutral vs. emotional (Do we display our emotions?) 
 Specific vs. diffuse (How separate we keep our private and working lives)
 Achievement vs. ascription (Do we have to prove ourselves to receive status or is it given to us?)
 Sequential vs. synchronic (Do we do things one at a time or several things at once?) 
 Internal vs. external control (Do we control our environment or are we controlled by it?) 
There are five orientations covering the ways in which human beings deal with each other.

Publications 
Books, a selection:
 1997. Riding The Waves of Culture: Understanding Diversity in Global Business with Charles Hampden-Turner
 2004. Business Across Cultures (Culture for Business Series) with Peter Woolliams 
 2004. Managing People Across Cultures (Culture for Business Series) with Charles Hampden-Turner
 2012. Cross-cultural management textbook: Lessons from the world leading experts, Introd. by Edgar H. Schein, Ed. by Jerome Dumetz, with Charles Hampden-Turner, Meredith Belbin, Jerome Dumetz, Juliette Tournand, Peter Woolliams, Olga Saginova, Stephen M. R. Covey, Dean Foster, Craig Storti, Joerg Schmitz
 2015. Nine Visions of Capitalism: Unlocking the Meanings of Wealth Creation, with Charles Hampden-Turner

Articles, a selection:
 Smith, Peter B., Shaun Dugan, and Fons Trompenaars. "National culture and the values of organizational employees a dimensional analysis across 43 nations." Journal of cross-cultural psychology 27.2 (1996): 231-264.
 Smith, Peter B., Fons Trompenaars, and Shaun Dugan. "The Rotter locus of control scale in 43 countries: A test of cultural relativity." International Journal of Psychology 30.3 (1995): 377-400.

References

External links 
 Trompenaars at Hampden-Turner Consulting
 Riding the Waves of Culture Talk video recording at TEDxAmsterdam, 6 November 2013

1953 births
Living people
Dutch anthropologists
Dutch business theorists
Cultural academics
Cross-cultural psychology
University of Amsterdam alumni
Wharton School of the University of Pennsylvania alumni
Shell plc people
Writers from Amsterdam